Theta Ceti, Latinized from θ Ceti, is a solitary, orange-hued star in the equatorial constellation of Cetus. It is visible to the naked eye with an apparent visual magnitude of 3.60. Based upon an annual parallax shift of 28.66 mas as seen from Earth, it is located about 114 light-years from the Sun. At that distance, the visual magnitude is diminished by an extinction factor of 0.10 due to interstellar dust.

With an age of about 2.2 billion years, this is an evolved, K-type giant star with a stellar classification of K0 III. It is a red clump star on the horizontal branch, which means it is generating energy through helium fusion at its core. The star has an estimated 1.8 times the mass of the Sun and has expanded to 10 times the Sun's radius. It is radiating 53 times the solar luminosity from its photosphere at an effective temperature of 4,660 K.

Name

In the catalogue of stars in the Calendarium of Al Achsasi Al Mouakket, this star was designated Thanih al Naamat (ثاني النعامات - thānī al-naʽāmāt), which was translated into Latin as Secunda Struthionum, meaning the second ostrich. This star, along with η Cet (Deneb Algenubi), τ Cet (Thalath Al Naamat), ζ Cet (Baten Kaitos) and υ Cet, were Al Naʽāmāt (النعامات), the Hen Ostriches.

References

K-type giants
Horizontal-branch stars
Ceti, Theta
Cetus (constellation)
Durchmusterung objects
Ceti, 45
008512
006537
0402